Karen Peterson is an American politician who formerly represented the 9th district of the Delaware Senate. First elected in 2002, she is a member of the Democratic Party. Peterson served in the Senate until 2016.

On May 7, 2013, Peterson came out as lesbian during Senate debate on same-sex marriage in Delaware, becoming the state's first openly LGBT legislator. At that time, she had been with her partner Vikki Bandy for 24 years, and the two had entered a civil union when Delaware legalized them the year before. The two were married on July 1, 2013, becoming the first same-sex couple to convert their existing civil union into marriage in Delaware.

References

External links

Democratic Party Delaware state senators
Living people
People from New Castle County, Delaware
Women state legislators in Delaware
LGBT state legislators in Delaware
Lesbian politicians
21st-century American politicians
21st-century American women politicians
Year of birth missing (living people)